The Iraq Petroleum Company (IPC), formerly known as the Turkish Petroleum Company (TPC), is an oil company that had a virtual monopoly on all oil exploration and production in Iraq between 1925 and 1961. It is jointly owned by some of the world's largest oil companies and headquartered in London, England, although today it is only a paper entity with historical rights and plays no part in the modern development of Middle Eastern oil.

In June 1972, the Ba'athist government in Iraq nationalized the IPC and its operations were taken over by the Iraq National Oil Company. The company "Iraq Petroleum Company" still remains extant, however, only on paper and one associated company – the Abu Dhabi Petroleum Company (ADPC, formerly Petroleum Development (Trucial Coast) Ltd) – also continues with its original shareholding intact.

The related Iraq Petroleum Group was an association of companies that played a major role in the discovery and development of oil resources in areas of the Middle East outside Iraq.

History

Turkish Petroleum Company

The forerunner of the Iraq Petroleum Company (IPC) was the Turkish Petroleum Company (TPC), which grew out of the growing belief, in the late 19th century, that Mesopotamia (Iraq and parts of Syria) contained substantial reservoirs of oil.

Since Mesopotamia was an Ottoman possession, early negotiations for an oil concession centered in the empire's capital, Constantinople. The first interest was shown by Imperial German banks and companies, already involved in building the Berlin-Baghdad railway. In 1911, in an attempt to bring together the competing British and German interests in the region, a British company known as African and Eastern Concession Ltd, was formed.

In 1912, this company became the Turkish Petroleum Company (TPC), formed with the purpose of acquiring concessions from the Ottoman Empire to explore for oil in Mesopotamia. The owners were a group of large European companies – Deutsche Bank, the Anglo Saxon Oil Company (a subsidiary of Royal Dutch Shell), the National Bank of Turkey (a British concern) – and Armenian businessman Calouste Gulbenkian. The driving force behind its creation was Gulbenkian, and the largest single shareholder was the British government-controlled Anglo-Persian Oil Company, which by 1914 held 50% of the shares. TPC received a promise of a concession from the Ottoman government, but the outbreak of World War I in 1914 put a stop to all exploration plans.

Deutsche Bank brought with it a concession granted to the Anatolian Railway Company to explore for minerals and oil along a -wide strip either side of its proposed railway in Mesopotamia. On 28 June 1914, the Turkish grand vizier confirmed the promise of a concession to TPC, but the outbreak of World War I ended TPC's plans.

When the Ottoman Empire was broken up in the aftermath of the war, the question of shareholding in TPC became a major issue at the 1920 San Remo conference, where the future of all non-Turkish and Arab-majority areas of the former Ottoman Empire were mostly decided. A rising demand for petroleum during the war had demonstrated to the big powers the importance of having their own sources of oil. Since one of the original partners of TPC had been German, the French demanded this share as the spoils of war. This was agreed by the San Remo Oil Agreement, much to the annoyance of the Americans who felt excluded from Middle Eastern oil and demanded an "open door". After prolonged and sometimes sharp diplomatic exchanges, U.S. oil companies were permitted to buy into the TPC, but it would take several years until the negotiations were completed.

Oil found in 1927
TPC obtained a concession to explore for oil in 1925, in return for a promise that the Iraqi government would receive a royalty for every ton of oil extracted, but linked to the oil companies' profits and not payable for the first 20 years. The concession required the company to select 24 rectangular plots of  each for drilling operations. During the 1925/6 season, an international geological party, comprising representatives of the shareholding companies together with an American contingent, conducted a wide-ranging survey of Iraq. Two wells were selected for drilling at Pulkanah and one each at Khashm al Ahmar, Injanah and Qaiyarah. Kirkuk was included as the sixth location. The well at Baba Gurgur was located by geologist J.M. Muir just north of Kirkuk. Drilling started, and in the early hours of 14 October 1927 oil was struck. Many tons of oil were spilled before the gushing well was brought under control, and the oil field soon proved to be extensive.

Red Line Agreement and the creation of IPC
The discovery hastened the negotiations over the composition of TPC, and on 31 July 1928 the shareholders signed a formal partnership agreement to include the Near East Development Corporation (NEDC), an American consortium of five large US oil companies that included Standard Oil of New Jersey, Standard Oil Company of New York (Socony), Gulf Oil, the Pan-American Petroleum and Transport Company, and Atlantic Richfield Co. Shares were held in the following proportions: 23.75% each to the Anglo-Persian Oil Company, Royal Dutch/Shell, the Compagnie Française des Pétroles (CFP), and the NEDC; the remaining 5% went to Calouste Gulbenkian. TPC was to be organized as a nonprofit company, registered in Britain, that produced crude oil for a fee for its parent companies, based on their shares. The company itself was only allowed to refine and sell to Iraq's internal market, in order to prevent any competition with the parent companies.

The agreement, known as Red Line Agreement after a red line was drawn around the former boundaries of the Ottoman Empire (with the exception of Kuwait), effectively bound the partners to act together within the red line. The writer Stephen Hemsley Longrigg, a former IPC employee, noted, "[T]he Red Line Agreement, variously assessed as a sad case of wrongful cartelization or as an enlightened example of international co‑operation and fair-sharing, was to hold the field for twenty years and in large measure determined the pattern and tempo of oil development over a large part of the Middle East". The Agreement lasted until 1948 when two of the American partners broke free. During the period, IPC monopolized oil exploration inside the Red Line; excluding Saudi Arabia and Bahrain, where ARAMCO (formed in 1944 by renaming of the Saudi subsidiary of Standard Oil of California (Socal)) and Bahrain Petroleum Company (BAPCO) respectively held controlling position.

The San Remo conference had stipulated that Iraqis should be allowed 20% of the company if they wanted to invest in it, but the existing shareholders successfully resisted Iraqi efforts to participate, despite pressure by the British government to accept Iraqi shareholders.

In 1929 the TPC was renamed the Iraq Petroleum Company. By 1934, the NEDC comprised only two shareholders, Standard Oil of New Jersey and Socony, which had merged with the Vacuum Oil Company to form Socony-Vacuum in 1931.

Delayed production start
The original concession of 14 March 1925 covered all of Iraq, but IPC was reluctant to develop it quickly and production was restricted to fields constituting only one-half of 1 percent of the country's total area. During the Great Depression, the world was awash with oil and greater output from Iraq would simply have driven the price down to even lower levels. Delaying tactics were employed not only in actual drilling and development, but also in conducting negotiations on such matters as pipeline rights-of-way.

The owners of IPC had conflicting interests: the Anglo-Persian Oil Company, Royal Dutch/Shell and Standard Oil had access to major sources of crude oil outside Iraq, and therefore wanted to hold the Iraqi concessions in reserve, whilst CFP and the other companies pushed for rapid development of Iraqi oil as they had limited crude oil supplies. These competing interests delayed the development of the Iraqi fields, and IPC's concession eventually expired because the companies failed to meet certain performance requirements, such as the construction of pipelines and shipping terminals. The concession was renegotiated in 1931, however, giving the company a 70-year concession on an enlarged  area east of the Tigris River. In return, the Iraqi government demanded, and received, additional payments and loans, as well as the promise that IPC would complete two oil pipelines to the Mediterranean by 1935—something CFP had demanded for a long time, in order to get its share of the oil quickly to France.

Different routes and terminal locations on the Mediterranean coast were sought by the French, who favored a northern route through Syria and Lebanon terminating at the city of Tripoli on the Lebanese coast, and the British and the Iraqis who preferred a southern route, terminating at Haifa, in what then was Palestine. The issue was settled by a compromise which provided for the construction of two pipelines, each with a throughput capacity of 2,000,000 tons a year. The length of the Northern line would be , that of the Southern line (Mosul-Haifa oil pipeline) . In 1934, the pipelines were completed from Kirkuk to Al Hadithah, and from there, to both Tripoli and Haifa; the Kirkuk Field was brought online the same year. Only in 1938, nine years after the discovery, did IPC begin to export oil in significant quantities.

The Kirkuk production averaged 4 million tons per year until World War II, when restricted shipping in the Mediterranean forced down the production sharply. Although the Iraq Government tried to open up the country to competition, the company taking up the new concession was bought out by IPC and, under the name of the Mosul Petroleum Company, was duly gathered into the IPC 'family' of associated companies (see below). The company also got the concession rights to southern Iraq in 1938, and founded the Basrah Petroleum Company (BPC) as their wholly owned subsidiary to develop the southern region of Iraq.

IPC partner disputes
Three issues caused protracted negotiations among the partner groups of IPC:

After lengthy negotiations the groups arrived at a compromise settlement in November 1934, which stipulated that D'Arcy Exploration (Anglo-Iranian) would be entitled to a 7.5-percent royalty on such oil as was produced from the  covered by the revised Iraq concession, the oil to be delivered free of cost at the field, with IPC paying the royalty due the Iraq Government.
 Tax matters: since IPC was a British-chartered company, the British groups would not have been subject to double taxation. The non-British groups, however, did not relish the idea of having the earnings of IPC taxed once by the British Government and again by their own governments. Eventually the groups agreed to transfer all pipeline operations to IPC, and price crude to the groups on the basis of management's estimate of British income tax cost plus 1 shilling profit per ton. Under this plan IPC's profits were nominal and its tax liability to the British Government was relatively small.
 Demise of the Red Line Agreement: two of the American oil companies in IPC were offered a partnership with ARAMCO to develop the oil resources of Saudi Arabia. Their partners in IPC refused to release them from the Red Line Agreement. After the Americans claimed that World War II had ended the Agreement, protracted legal proceedings with Gulbenkian followed. Eventually the case was settled out of court and the American partners joined ARAMCO. The French Government and Gulbenkian had withdrawn their objections in exchange for a greater share of IPC's output, and the Red Line agreement boundaries were redrawn to exclude Saudi Arabia, Yemen, Bahrain, Egypt, Israel, and the western-half of Jordan.

IPC Group operations outside Iraq
As the Red Line Agreement defined the company's sphere of operations well beyond the boundaries of Iraq, IPC's shareholders were keen to look for oil elsewhere in the Middle East. They created associated companies, one for each territory to be explored. These companies were collectively known as "The IPC Group". They would obtain from the sovereign power an exploration licence covering simple exploration over a defined geographical area, or a concession permitting exploration and the production of oil. By 1948, the company had created 12 companies with concessions or exploration licences: Petroleum Development (Cyprus Ltd), Lebanon Petroleum Company Ltd, Petroleum Development (Palestine) Ltd, Syrian Petroleum Company Ltd, Trans-Jordan Petroleum Company Ltd, Mosul Petroleum Company Ltd, Basrah Petroleum Company Ltd, Petroleum Development (Qatar) Ltd, Petroleum Development (Trucial Coast) Ltd, Petroleum Development (Oman and Dhofar) Ltd, Petroleum Concessions Ltd (for the Aden Protectorates), Petroleum Development (Western Arabia) Ltd.

In 1933, IPC joined negotiations for an oil concession in Al-Hasa province, Saudi Arabia, bidding against Standard Oil of California (SOCAL, later renamed Chevron). Represented by Stephen Hemsley Longrigg, the company's bid failed when it offered payment in rupees rather than the gold that King Abdul-Aziz (also known as Ibn Saud) desired. SOCAL gained the concession and, joined by the Texas Oil Company in 1936, went on to discover oil at Dammam through its subsidiary, California-Arabian Standard Oil Company (Casoc) in 1938. Thereafter, IPC concentrated its efforts in Arabia in developing its Qatar oil concession (oil discovered 1939), Abu Dhabi (oil discovered in 1959), Oman (see Petroleum Development Oman) and the Aden Protectorates (in today's Yemen). IPC personnel carried out a series of ground-breaking explorations in southern Arabia during these years.

The failure of IPC to secure concessions in Bahrain and Saudi Arabia should not obscure the fact that elsewhere in the Middle East the company was successful in closing the "open door" of commercial opportunity to outsiders. The principal competitors for concessions were British Oil Development Co. Ltd.(BOD), and SOCAL. When BOD became interested in concessions in northern Iraq, IPC eventually bought them out. In addition, IPC attempted, though without success, to extend further its area of operations by seeking concessions or exploration permits in Turkey and in the neutral zones of Kuwait and Saudi Arabia.

In 1937, IPC signed an oil concession agreement with the Sultan of Muscat that would cover the entire region of the Sultanate. IPC, however, failed to discover oil in the Sultanate's region, which was limited to the coastal area of Oman, and informed the Sultan that oil is more likely to exist in the interior region of Oman. The Treaty of Seeb provided autonomous rule to the Omanis who resided in the interior region of Oman, which was called the Imamate of Oman, by stating that the Sultanate "should not interfere in their [Imamate] internal affairs". IPC offered financial support to the Sultan in order to raise a military force that would occupy the Imamate's region so that IPC would gain access to the possible oil reserves. The Sultanate, backed by the British government and the financial support received from IPC, attacked the interior of Oman on 25 October 1954 triggering Jebel Akhdar War.

IPC was also interested in other ventures apart from oil, such as potash mining in Trans-Jordan, asphalt in Syria (for which it set up a company, Société Industrielle des Asphaltes et Pétroles de Lattique) and salt mining in the Aden Protectorates - although this latter venture was never developed. The company created air transport companies, the Iraq Petroleum Transport Company and Transports du Proche Orient, to operate aircraft and vessels to ferry people and equipment to the remoter parts of its concession areas.

IPC-Government relations

During the Hashemite Monarchy (1932–58), there were no serious issues between the IPC and the Iraqi government as the Hashemites were extremely pro-west. In fact, they had been installed by the British, and therefore tensions were minimized. They were dependent on the British militarily and had essentially pledged allegiance to them through the Baghdad Pact. The Hashemites' main disputes centered on increasing the amount of crude oil extracted, getting more Iraqis involved in the process of producing the oil and getting more royalties. In 1952, terms that were more generous to the Iraqi government were negotiated. These terms were largely based on the far more lucrative terms of the Saudi-Aramco "50/50" agreement of December 1950. One could argue that a determinant in these negotiations was the friendly atmosphere in which they were conducted.

This atmosphere did not continue to the negotiations held between the IPC and revolutionary governments that followed the overthrow of the Hashemite monarchy in 1958. Relations between the two can be examined on two major factors. First, oil was a vital part of the Iraqi economy. Because of this, the IPC had a huge impact on the amount of revenue that the government generated and thus had a certain amount of influence over the government. The second major factor was inability of the Iraqi government at that time to source the technical knowledge and skill necessary to take over oil operations in the country.

The Qasim era

Beginning in the early 1950s, as the strength of nationalism in Iraq grew, the focus came to bear on foreign control over the oil production of the country. Abd al-Karim Qasim was a nationalist Iraqi Army general who seized power in a 1958 coup d'état in which the Iraqi monarchy was murdered. He ruled the country as Prime Minister of Iraq until his downfall and death in 1963. Before the coup, he used the fact that the IPC was producing oil for western nations rather than for the benefit of Iraq citizens as one of his main points of contention with the Iraqi government. Once in power, he was critical of several aspects of the IPC. First, he was critical of the monetary arrangement between the IPC and the government. He also did not appreciate the monopoly that the IPC had been granted.

However the economic situation at the time did not permit Qasim to nationalize the IPC – western nations had boycotted Iranian oil when Mossadeq nationalized its oil company and could be expected to do the same in this case. (It is likely that nationalization would have been Qasim's favored route had he had the necessary capabilities). Further, Iraqis lacked the technical and managerial capabilities to run the IPC. Qasim needed the oil revenues to run his government and to keep the military satisfied. Therefore, Qasim resorted to many other tactics including increasing transit rates at Basra by 1,200%. In response, the IPC stopped producing oil that used Basra as a shipping point. The ensuing confrontation was the lowest point in relations between the two up to this point.

On 12 December 1961, the Iraqi government enacted Law No. 80, which expropriated 99.5 per cent of the IPC group's concession areas without compensation and put an immediate stop on oil exploration. Law 80 did not impact the IPC's ongoing production at Az Zubair and Kirkuk, but all other territories, including North Rumaila, were returned to Iraqi state control. One major difference between these negotiations and those of 1952, was the stance of the Iraqi government. Whereas it had been more willing to accommodate the IPC in 1952, the government's positions under Qasim were largely non-negotiable. However this should not be surprising because it was expected that Qasim would take advantage of growing Arab nationalism and a sense amongst many ordinary Iraqis that they were being exploited by the west.

1972 nationalization

Throughout the 1960s, the Iraqi government criticized the IPC and used the IPC as a central piece of their anti-western propaganda. The Soviet-Iraqi agreement of 1969 emboldened the Iraqi government and in 1970 they made a list of demands including ownership of 20% of the company's assets and more control. The IPC by this time was taking the Iraqi government very seriously and made some huge concessions. They agreed to increase oil production substantially and also increase the price of its crude oil in certain areas. They also offered an advance payment on royalties.

However this was not enough for the Iraqi government and they issued a new set of demands in November 1970 which essentially involved more Iraqi control of operations and more Iraqi profit-taking. Dissatisfied with the IPC's unwillingness to negotiate on Iraq's terms, the Iraqi government gave the IPC an ultimatum with similar demands in May 1972. The IPC tried to offer a compromise solution but the Ba'athist government rejected the offer and, on 1 June 1972, nationalized IPC operations, which were taken over by the Iraq National Oil Company.

The Kirkuk field still forms the basis for northern Iraqi oil production. Kirkuk has over 10 billion barrels (1.6 km³) of remaining proven oil reserves. The Jambur, Bai Hassan, and Khabbaz fields are the only other currently producing oil fields in northern Iraq. While Iraq's northern oil industry remained relatively unscathed during the Iran-Iraq War, an estimated 60% of the facilities in southern and central Iraq were damaged in the Gulf War. Post-1991 fighting between Kurdish and Iraqi forces in northern Iraq resulted in temporary sabotage of the Kirkuk field's facilities. In 1996, production capacity in northern and central Iraq was estimated at between 0.7 and 1 million barrels (110,000 to 160,000 m³) per day, down from around 1.2 million barrels (190,000 m³) per day before the Gulf War.

IPC today
IPC has ceased operations, but the company "Iraq Petroleum Company Limited" still remains extant as a name on paper, and one of its surviving associated companies – Abu Dhabi Petroleum Company (ADPC), formerly Petroleum Development (Trucial Coast) Limited – continued with the original shareholding intact until January 2014. ADPC still holds 40% of the onshore concession in Abu Dhabi, with the majority 60% held by the Abu Dhabi National Oil Company (ADNOC) on behalf of the Abu Dhabi Government. Operations are carried out by the local operating company – the Abu Dhabi Company for Onshore Oil Operations (ADCO) – jointly owned by ADNOC, and the ADPC shareholders: BP, Royal Dutch Shell, ExxonMobil, TotalEnergies and Partex; reflecting the historical make-up of the Iraq Petroleum Company. The Abu Dhabi onshore oil concession expired in January 2014.

Abu Dhabi Petroleum Company Limited was dissolved on 4 October 2018, while Iraq Petroleum Company Limited still exists, now using company number 09646587 instead of 00113948. "New" Iraq Petroleum Company Limited was incorporated on 18 June 2015 as "BP Newco 1 Limited" and succeeded operations of "old" Iraq Petroleum Company, Limited, which dissolved on 30 December 2015.

Publications and films
In 1948, IPC published its Handbook of the Territories which Form the Theatre of Operations of the Iraq Petroleum Company Limited and its Associated Companies authored by Stephen Hemsley Longrigg. The IPC Film Unit produced a number of short films, most notably The Third River, a film produced in 1952 about operations around the Iraq-Mediterranean pipeline, and Rivers of Time, produced in 1957, about the history of Mesopotamia. Ageless Iraq was an historical film made for IPC by British Pathé. The company published a monthly magazine, entitled Iraq Petroleum, from August 1951 until April/May 1957. An insert in the January 1957 edition read "In the light of present circumstances it has been found necessary to restrict the production of Iraq Petroleum and... publication will be bi-monthly until further notice." An in-house company magazine, The Crescent, continued in print until the 1970s. The IPC Newsletter, a quarterly magazine for IPC pensioners, was issued between 1974 and 2014.

See also

 Baba Gurgur
 Abd al-Karim Qasim
 Anglo-Iraqi War
 Oil reserves in Iraq
 Red Line Agreement

References

Further reading
 Brown, Michael E. "The Nationalization of the Iraqi Petroleum Company." International Journal of Middle East Studies 10.1 (1979): 107–124.
 Dietrich, Christopher RW. "'Arab Oil Belongs to the Arabs': Raw Material Sovereignty, Cold War Boundaries, and the Nationalisation of the Iraq Petroleum Company, 1967–1973." Diplomacy & Statecraft 22.3 (2011): 450–479. Online
 Fitzgerald, Edward Peter. "The Iraq Petroleum Company, Standard Oil of California, and the Contest for Eastern Arabia, 1930–1933." International History Review 13.3 (1991): 441–465.
 Saul, Samir. "Masterly inactivity as brinkmanship: the Iraq petroleum company's route to nationalization, 1958–1972." International History Review 29.4 (2007): 746–792.
 Silverfarb, David. “The Revision of Iraq’s Oil Concessions, 1949–1952,” Middle Eastern Studies, 23(1996), pp. 69–95.

External links
 Iraq Petroleum Company at Al-Mashriq website
 Morton, Michael Quentin, "Once Upon a Red Line: The Iraq Petroleum Story 1887–1979"

 
Oil and gas companies of Iraq
Defunct oil companies
Anglo-Persian Oil Company
Energy companies established in 1912
Non-renewable resource companies established in 1912
1912 establishments in the Ottoman Empire
1912 establishments in Asia
20th century in Iraq
Iraq–United Kingdom relations
Defunct energy companies of Iraq
Defunct oil and gas companies of the United Kingdom